Lo Weng Hou is a Macau footballer who plays as a goalkeeper.

Club career
Lo currently plays at MFA Development.

International career
Lo was included in the squad where they won the runners-up in the 2016 AFC Solidarity Cup in Malaysia.

Honours

International 
Macau
 2016 AFC Solidarity Cup: 2016 runners-up

References

1996 births
Living people
Macau footballers
Macau international footballers
Association football goalkeepers
Liga de Elite players